Klaus Dudenhöfer (1924–2008) was a German film editor.

Selected filmography
 Nora's Ark (1948)
 Derby (1949)
 Dangerous Guests (1949)
 My Wife's Friends (1949)
 You Have to be Beautiful (1951)
 Under the Thousand Lanterns (1952)
 Fight of the Tertia (1952)
 Don't Forget Love  (1953)
 A Woman of Today (1954)
 Columbus Discovers Kraehwinkel (1954)
 Des Teufels General (1955)
 Secrets of the City (1955)
 Request Concert (1955)
 Bambuti (1956)
 The Captain from Köpenick (1956)
 At Green Cockatoo by Night (1957)
 Lemke's Widow (1957)
 The Zurich Engagement (1957)
 The Goose of Sedan (1959)
 Black Gravel (1961)
 Two Among Millions (1961)
 The House in Montevideo (1963)
 Homesick for St. Pauli (1963)

External links

1924 births
2008 deaths
German film editors
Film people from Dresden